Robert Lacarrière (22 November 1898 – 8 August 1970) was a French sailor. He competed in the 6 Metre event at the 1948 Summer Olympics.

References

External links
 

1898 births
1970 deaths
French male sailors (sport)
Olympic sailors of France
Sailors at the 1948 Summer Olympics – 6 Metre
Place of birth missing (living people)